Mistigri is a 1931 French drama film adapted by Marcel Achard from his play of the same name. It was directed by Harry Lachman and stars Madeleine Renaud, Noël-Noël and Jean Debucourt. It was made at the Joinville Studios by the French subsidiary of Paramount Pictures.

Cast
 Madeleine Renaud as Nell 'Mistigri' Marignan  
 Noël-Noël as Zamore  
 Jean Debucourt as Dr. Chalabre  
 André Dubosc as Marignan  
 Jules Moy as Cormeau  
 Simone Héliard as Fanny  
 Magdeleine Bérubet as Madame Perache  
 Ritou Lancyle 
 Monique Rolland
 Janine Borelli 
 Marie-Jacqueline Chantal 
 André Randall 
 André Simon 
 Pedro Elviro
 Raymond Aimos
 Gustave Huberdeau

References

Bibliography 
 Dayna Oscherwitz & MaryEllen Higgins. The A to Z of French Cinema. Scarecrow Press, 2009.

External links 
 

1931 films
French drama films
1931 drama films
1930s French-language films
Films directed by Harry Lachman
Paramount Pictures films
Films shot at Joinville Studios
French black-and-white films
French films based on plays
1930s French films